A teacherage is a house for one or more schoolteachers, like a parsonage is a house for a parson or minister of a Protestant church.

Notable examples include:
Markham School and Teacherage, Oilton, Oklahoma, listed on the National Register of Historic Places (NRHP)
San Juan Teacherage, in Grant County, New Mexico, NRHP-listed
Fuquay Springs Teacherage, Fuquay-Varina, North Carolina, NRHP-listed
Fountain Inn Principal's House and Teacherage, Fountain Inn, South Carolina, NRHP-listed
Great Branch Teacherage, Orangeburg, South Carolina, NRHP-listed
Garland Community School Teacherage, Dekalb, Texas, NRHP-listed

In popular culture
The orphanage is closed down and sold to become a teacherage at the end of the novel, The BFG.